Charles William Bolsius (June 23, 1907 - March 23, 1983) - was born in 's-Hertogenbosch, the Netherlands, the youngest in an upper-middle-class bourgeoisie family. His father ran the regional Gas Works and Bolsius formally studied art in The Hague before emigrating to the United States and moving to New Mexico in the early 1930s. He quickly assimilated into the art communities of Albuquerque and Santa Fe showing with the significant artist of the period. Bolsius had artistically matured within Dutch - German Expressionism. His woodblock handprints, using subject matter from the American West, capitalized on flat, bold, stark patterns and rough-hewn effects that were hallmarks of the expressionist woodblock tradition. His heavy light-filled moody paintings with cloudy brooding skies combined expressionistic influences with expansive western landscapes and the optimism of American impressionism.  His work was critically recognized and exhibited at major museums and galleries throughout New Mexico and Arizona. 

Bolsius settled in Tucson in 1934. With his brother, Adrian "Pete" Bolsius, and sister-in-law Nan Bolsius the trio purchased the adobe ruins of the Fort Lowell Post Traders Store, (seven miles northeast of downtown Tucson) rebuilding it over the next decade into one of the great examples of Pueblo Revival architecture in Arizona. Together they established the Fort Lowell Arts Colony. Bolsius is known for his paintings, woodblock prints, architectural design, and hand-carved Spanish colonial revival furniture and doors.

Early life and education

Charles Bolsius was born in 's-Hertogenbosch, Holland to Caroline Maria Wilhelmei Bijvoet (1864-1935) and Petrus Nieduas Josephus Mariannus Bolsius (1859-1934). His family moved  to the village of Voorburg in 1922. In 1924, at the age of 17, Charles enrolled in art school. He spent five years at the Koninklijke Academie van Beeldende Kunsten Den Haag (Royal Academy of Art, The Hague). 

Bolsius's sophisticated artistic sensibility was influenced by German and Dutch expressionists including Leo Gestel, Jan Toorop, Kees van Dongen, and Emil Nolde. His known early work was primarily dramatic land and cityscapes. His artistic ability and style developed within the school of Dutch and German Expressionism in the late 1920s and these stylistic threads would continue to permeate through and influence his entire artistic career. At 23 years old Bolsius left Holland and headed to the United States to stay with his Brother Adrian “Pete” Bolsius and his wife Nan Bolsius in Albuquerque.

Career

The 23-year old Bolsius arrived at the port of San Pedro, Los Angeles California, on October 28, 1930. Arriving in the western United States, Bolsius’s art began to embrace the scale and environmental tonality of the American West. He began painting the environment of New Mexico, and lived in Santa Fe, Albuquerque and in the Sandia Mountains in the village of San Antonito, Bernalillo County, New Mexico. During the early 1930s, he exhibited across the state and began receiving critical attention.   

The Bolsius family moved to the San Francisco Bay Area before settling in Tucson, Arizona. On a sketching trip to the rural outskirts of Tucson in the farming community of Old Fort Lowell, Bolsius discovered the melting adobe ruins of the 1873 Fort Post Traders Store. He brought his brother and sister-in-law back to the site and after a lengthy discussion, the tree decided to make an offer and embark on re-constructing the dilapidated rambling building.  

The project received local and national attention, was published in journals, and newspapers and became a cultural hub. The project, named Las Saetas was recognized as an important example of Pueblo Revival architectural design and was photographed by numerous noted architectural photographers. 

Bolsius continued to produce and show his art through the 1930s and 1940s, exhibiting in Arizona, New Mexico, Utah, and San Francisco. Bolsius served in WWII. Returning home from the European theater he worked with Nan on the reconstruction of the Fort Lowell Commissary naming the project El Cuartel Viejo The Old Barracks.  After the completion of that project, he designed and built his own home, the Charles Bolsius House over a three decade period. Bolsius was a member of many Tucson art organizations. The architectural projects had created a vehicle to develop and hone a Spanish colonial revival wood carving skill that was rooted in the New Mexico WPA furniture movement. He began professionally producing doors and furniture in the 1940s which continued through the 1970s. His final building project was the burnt adobe, late Territorial Revival LeaChar House in the Tanque Verde, Arizona area east of Tucson. The final project included classic hand carved woodwork and doors. The screened Arizona Room was constructed of the dismantled gate that had original been created for Las Saetas.

His woodwork can be seen throughout the old Fort Lowell Historic District, Arizona State University Louise Lincoln Kerr House and Studio, in homes in Tucson's  Catalina Foothills (including the front door of 2540 East Camino La Zorrela),  the Church Doors of Sasabe, Arizona (which were lent out to the film Lilies of the Field) and the dining room table at Rancho De La Osa in Sasabe, Arizona.

Bolsius died in March 1983 in Tucson, Pima County, Arizona.

Legacy
Bolsius's major architectural work and examples of his carved doors are clustered in the Old Fort Lowell Historic District in Tucson, Arizona. The rebuilt Fort Lowell Commissary that he named El Cuartel Viejo was purchased by the City of Tucson with major restoration anticipated in 2023-2024. The buildings will be open to the public as part of the cultural multi-million dollar redevelopment and historic imperative program for Fort Lowell Park.  

Although Bolsius showed widely in New Mexico and Arizona in the 1930 and 1940s he did not pressure rigorous promotion or sale of his art. As a result, his paintings are all privately owned and currently not part of any public permanent collection.

Art Exhibitions
 1931, Sandia Park Store, Sandia Mountains, New Mexico 		 
 1932,	Museum of New Mexico, Annual Exhibition Painters and Sculptors of the Southwest, Santa Fe, New Mexico			
 1932, Museum of New Mexico, Paintings by “Sheldon Parsons, Carl Bolsius, and Hubert Rogers,” Santa Fe, New Mexico			
 1932, Santa Fe Museum, Exhibit of Bolsius’s paintings and woodblocks, Santa Fe, New Mexico		
 1932, Romero Gallery, Southwestern Artists, Albuquerque, New Mexico				 
 1933,	The University of New Mexico, Art League of New Mexico, Group Show, Albuquerque, New Mexico
 1933,	Romero Gallery, Albuquerque Society of Artists First Annual Exhibit, Albuquerque, New Mexico	
 1934,	Carlito Springs Dining Room, Tijeras Canyon, New Mexico 	
 1934,	Museum of New Mexico, Annual Exhibition Painters and Sculptors of the Southwest, Santa Fe, New Mexico			
 1934, Beach Auditorium, Santa Cruz Art League Statewide Art Exhibit, Santa Cruz, California		
 1938, Tucson Fine Arts Association, Art Rental Association
 1939,	The University of Arizona Art Department, The Paintings of Charles Bolsius, Tucson, Arizona  	
 1940, Women’s Club Silver Tea Exhibition, Las Sientas, Tucson, Arizona 
 1940, Temple Art Gallery, Tucson Fine Arts Association 4th Annual Old Pueblo Open Show, Tucson, Arizona 
 1940, Studio Strange, Tucson, Arizona
 1940, Tucson Center of Arts and Crafts, Tucson, Arizona 
 1941,	Temple Art Gallery, Palette and Brush Show, Tucson, Arizona  				
 1941,	Tucson Fine Arts Association, Tucson, Arizona
 1941,	Temple Art Gallery, Exhibition of Southwestern Oils, Tucson, Arizona 				
 1942, Springville Annual National Art Exhibit, Springerville, Utah 		
 1943,	Museum of New Mexico, Olive Rush, Helen Needham, Caroline Pickard, Charles Bolsius, J. H. Sharp, Santa Fe, New Mexico.  	
 1944, Aiea Hospital WWII Collection, Aiea Hospital at Pearl Harbor, Hawaii 			
 1946, Springville Annual National Art Exhibit, Springerville, Utah 
 1947,	Springville Annual National Art Exhibit, Springerville, Utah 
 1947, Southern Arizona Bank And Trust Gallery, Tucson, Arizona		
 1947,	Gumps, San Francisco, California			
 1949,	Arizona State Fair, Art Exhibition, Phoenix, Arizona

Architectural works
Bolsius designed and built only a handful of architectural projects. He worked with architectural designer Veronica Hughart who incorporated his doors and woodwork into her projects. Following is a list of some of Bolsius's most important works, which are located in Tucson unless otherwise noted.

 Las Saetas, redesign and construction of Fort Lowell Post Traders Store, Old Fort Lowell, (1934)
 El Cuartel Viejo, redesign and construction of Fort Lowell Commissary, Old Fort Lowell, (1942 - 1949)
 The Charles Bolsius House, Old Fort Lowell, (1949 - 1972)
 LeaChar House, 1771 North King Street, Tanque Verde, Tucson, Arizona, (1979)

Doors and Woodwork
 Sasabe Chapel, Sasabe, Arizona (1941) 
 Issadro O. Ochoa House / Louise M. Murray Casita, 5328 E Fort Lowell Road (Old Fort Lowell), Tucson, Arizona, 1948 
 Louise Lincoln Kerr House and Studio, 6110 N Scottsdale Rd, Scottsdale, Arizona, (1948 - 1959) 
 Casita Mesquite, 4500 North Camino Del Obispo, Tucson Arizona (1956), Bolsius Doors (1970)
 S. Bayard Colgate House, 4100 North Avenida Del Cazador, Flecha Caída Estates, Tucson, Arizona, (1959) 
 Backus Otto House, 2540 East Camino La Zorrela, Tucson, Arizona (1959)
 Casa Cheruy, 3031 North Craycaroft Road, (Old Fort Lowell), Tucson, Arizona Veronica Hughart designed addition with Bolsius door, (c. 1965)
 Nora and Dr. James W. Pickrell Ranch, Nogales Arizona, Veronica Hughart designed, (1965) 
 Kathryn L. and Horace B. Woodward House, 2841 North Orlando Avenue, Tucson, Arizona, (1969) 
 Cross Farm, 5825 East Cloud Road, Tucson, Arizona, Veronica Hughart designed, (1969)
 Priscilla G. Timpkin Estate, 8451 East Cloud Road, Tucson, Arizona, Veronica Hughart designed, (1969)
 Winifred E. and Daniel R. Davies House, 4100 Avenida Del Cazador, Flecha Caída Estates, Tucson Arizona, (1959) Veronica Hughart designed, Bolsius doors (1972)
 Episcopal Chapel of the Resurrection, 7110 South 12th Avenue, Tucson, Arizona (1972)

References

External links
 CharlesBolsius.com
 Work in Old Fort Lowell
 Old Fort Lowell:
 ASU Kerr House
 Biographical information, at AskArt.com website supporting art auctions

1907 births
1983 deaths
20th-century American architects
20th-century American sculptors
20th-century American male artists
20th-century American painters
Architects from Tucson, Arizona
American male painters
American male sculptors
American furniture designers
Artists from Tucson, Arizona
Artists from Albuquerque, New Mexico
Artists of the American West
Dutch emigrants to the United States
Painters from New Mexico
Sculptors from Arizona
Sculptors from New Mexico